Berrington is a small village and civil parish in Shropshire, England. According to the 2001 census the village had a population of 30, though the parish, which also includes the larger village of Cross Houses and other settlements such as Betton Strange and Cantlop, had a population of 805 in total.

The village is about five miles SE of Shrewsbury. The local newsletter, The Village Pump, is distributed bi-monthly. There is a phone box and a village hall.

A notable feature in the parish, but not the village itself, is Cantlop Bridge. The village primary school closed in 1994 and has since been converted into a private residence.

A damaged wooden effigy in the parish church (All Saints) is known locally as 'Old Scriven'. It is said that he once fought a lion, hence his damaged face. 

Berrington Manor is a Grade II* listed 17th century timber-framed house, located opposite All Saints church.

See also
Listed buildings in Berrington, Shropshire

References

External links

 http://friendsofberringtonchurch.weebly.com/

Villages in Shropshire
Civil parishes in Shropshire
Shrewsbury and Atcham